Albert Campbell may refer to:

Albert J. Campbell (1857–1907), U.S. Representative from Montana
Albert Campbell (singer) (1872–1947), American pioneer recording artist
Albert Ralph Campbell (1875–1925), American Medal of Honor recipient
Albert Campbell (dogsled racer) (1894–1961), Canadian dogsled racer
Albert Campbell (Canadian politician) (1910–1973)
Albert Campbell (footballer) (born 1938), Northern Ireland former footballer
Ken Campbell (basketball) (Albert Kenton Campbell, 1926–1999), American basketball player

See also
Al Campbell (disambiguation)